Berliște is a commune in Caraș-Severin County, western Romania with a population of 1,358 people. It is composed of five villages: Berliște, Iam (Jám), Milcoveni (Mirkóc), Rusova Nouă (Újruszolc) and Rusova Veche (Óruszolc).

References

Communes in Caraș-Severin County
Localities in Romanian Banat